The Freier Round Barn is a historic round barn in rural Jones County, South Dakota, United States. It is located on the north side of County Highway 16, northeast of Draper. The barn was built in 1918, from a pre-cut kit ordered by catalog. It is the only known example of a pre-cut wood frame barn in the state.

The barn was listed on the National Register of Historic Places in 1995.

See also
National Register of Historic Places listings in Jones County, South Dakota

References

Barns on the National Register of Historic Places in South Dakota
Buildings and structures in Jones County, South Dakota
Infrastructure completed in 1918
Round barns in South Dakota
National Register of Historic Places in Jones County, South Dakota